Allef de Andrade Rodrigues (born 4 November 1994) is a Brazilian footballer who plays for Russian club Volga Ulyanovsk.

Career
On 24 July 2021, Atyrau announced the signing of Allef.

References

1994 births
Sportspeople from Bahia
Brazilian footballers
Living people
Association football forwards
Santa Cruz Futebol Clube players
S.U. 1º Dezembro players
C.D. Mafra players
Real S.C. players
Vitória F.C. players
FC Baltika Kaliningrad players
FC Atyrau players
FC Volga Ulyanovsk players
Campeonato de Portugal (league) players
Primeira Liga players
Russian First League players
Kazakhstan Premier League players
Brazilian expatriate footballers
Expatriate footballers in Portugal
Brazilian expatriate sportspeople in Portugal
Expatriate footballers in Russia
Brazilian expatriate sportspeople in Russia
Expatriate footballers in Kazakhstan
Brazilian expatriate sportspeople in Kazakhstan